Fire Within may refer to:

 Fire Within (album), 2013 album by Birdy
 Fire Within, 2004 EP by Lullacry
 "Fire Within", song by American band Kamelot from album Eternity

See also
 Cirque du Soleil: Fire Within, Canadian reality television series
 The Fire Within (disambiguation)